Chen Jiayong (also romanized as Chia-yung Chen; 17 February 1922 – 26 August 2019) was a Chinese metallurgist and chemical engineer. He was a research professor and Vice President of the Institute of Process Engineering of the Chinese Academy of Sciences (CAS). A pioneer in the development of hydrometallurgy in China, he was elected an academician of the CAS in 1980. He was awarded the State Science and Technology Prizes five times and the Ho Leung Ho Lee Prize for Scientific and Technological Progress in 1996.

Early life and education
Chen was born on 17 February 1922 in Jintang County, Sichuan. He was the fourth child and eldest son of his father Chen Songpu, a school teacher. In 1925, his family moved to Chengdu, where he studied at Chengdu County Primary School and Chengdu County High School (now Chengdu No. 7 High School).

In 1939, he was admitted to the Department of Chemical Engineering of National Central University, then exiled in Chongqing during the Second Sino-Japanese War. After graduating in 1943, he was hired by the university as a faculty member. Under the guidance of Gao Jiyu, he was the first in China to successfully synthesize the pesticide DDT.

Career in the United States 
After the end of World War II, Chen was awarded a Chinese government scholarship to pursue graduate studies in the United States in 1947. He earned his master's and Ph.D. (in 1952) from the University of Illinois at Urbana–Champaign (UIUC), under the supervision of Sherlock Swann and H.F. Johnstone.

In 1952, he became a postdoctoral researcher at the Massachusetts Institute of Technology, before returning to UIUC to work under Johnstone. His highly cited paper "Filtration of Aerosols by Fibrous Media" was published in the journal Chemical Reviews in 1955. In 1954, he became a research engineer at the Yerkes Research Laboratory of the chemical company DuPont.

Career in China 
In 1956, the American government reached an agreement with the PRC to permit Chinese students in the US to go home, who had been banned from moving back to China since the Korean War. Chen and his wife decided to return to China with their two daughters. On the invitation of the renowned metallurgist Ye Zhupei (Yap Chu-Phay), he accepted the position as Director of the Hydrometallurgical Laboratory of the Institute of Chemical Metallurgy (renamed as the Institute of Process Engineering in 2001), which was then being established by Ye under the Chinese Academy of Sciences (CAS).

Although not specifically trained in metallurgy, Chen accepted the challenge to develop hydrometallurgy in China. Hydrometallurgy, a more energy-efficient and cleaner process than traditional pyrometallurgy, is especially suitable for the extraction of uranium, copper, and other non-ferrous metals. He spent years working under harsh conditions at the copper mine of Dongchuan, Yunnan, and oversaw the construction of a copper factory nearby, which was opened in 1964. He also worked at the mines in Jinchuan, Gansu and Panzhihua, Sichuan, and made technological breakthroughs to efficiently separate non-ferrous metals such as gold, silver, copper, nickel, and cobalt. During the Cultural Revolution, the technologies he developed were exported to Albania as part of China's foreign-aid program. He later served as Vice President of the Institute of Process Engineering.

Chen supervised more than 50 graduate students, and published reference books including A Handbook on Hydrometallurgy (湿法冶金手册). He was awarded the State Science and Technology Prizes five times and the Ho Leung Ho Lee Prize for Scientific and Technological Progress in 1996. Chen was elected an academician of the Chinese Academy of Sciences in 1980.

In 2017, the CAS named China's first satellite for chemical engineering experiment after Chen. The CHEN Jiayong-1 was launched into space from India in February 2017. It was the first satellite named after a Chinese scientist.

Chen was a member of the Communist Party of China. He served five consecutive terms as a member of the 4th to the 8th National Committees of the Chinese People's Political Consultative Conference.

Death
On 26 August 2019, he died in Beijing at the age of 97. He was buried at the Babaoshan Revolutionary Cemetery.

Personal life
In 1948 Chen married his university classmate Liu Rong in the United States. The couple had two daughters.

References

1922 births
2019 deaths
Chemists from Sichuan
Chinese chemical engineers
Chinese expatriates in the United States
Chinese metallurgists
DuPont people
Engineers from Sichuan
Massachusetts Institute of Technology fellows
Members of the Chinese Academy of Sciences
Members of the 4th Chinese People's Political Consultative Conference
Members of the 5th Chinese People's Political Consultative Conference
Members of the 6th Chinese People's Political Consultative Conference
Members of the 7th Chinese People's Political Consultative Conference
Members of the 8th Chinese People's Political Consultative Conference
National Central University alumni
Academic staff of the National Central University
Politicians from Chengdu
University of Illinois Urbana-Champaign alumni
People's Republic of China politicians from Sichuan
Educators from Sichuan
People from Jintang County